Pleasant View is an unincorporated community in Moral Township, Shelby County, in the U.S. state of Indiana.

History
Pleasant View was laid out and platted in 1836 as a stagecoach stop on the Michigan turnpike. Two old variant names of the community were called Wrights and Doblestown. A post office was established under the name Wrights in 1828, and was renamed to Doblestown in 1837. It was renamed again to Pleasant View in 1841 and was discontinued in 1859.

Geography

References

Unincorporated communities in Shelby County, Indiana
Unincorporated communities in Indiana